The Dragon Database for Human Transcription Co-Factors and Transcription Factor Interacting Proteins (TcoF-DB) is a database that facilitates the exploration of proteins involved in the regulation of transcription in humans by binding to regulatory DNA regions (transcription factors) and proteins involved in the regulation of transcription in humans by interacting with transcription factors and not binding to regulatory DNA regions (transcription co-factors). The database describes a total of 529 (potential) human transcription co-factors interacting with a total of 1365 human transcription factors.

See also
 Transcription factor
 Transcription coregulator

References

External links
 

Biological databases
Gene expression
Genetics databases
Transcription factors
Biophysics